Xanthomyia is a genus of tephritid  or fruit flies in the family Tephritidae.

Species
Xanthomyia alpestris (Pokorny, 1887)
Xanthomyia japonica (Shiraki, 1933)
Xanthomyia nora (Doane, 1899)
Xanthomyia platyptera (Loew, 1873)

References

Tephritinae
Tephritidae genera
Diptera of Europe
Diptera of Asia
Diptera of North America